David Charles Marsden (born in Toronto, Ontario) is a Canadian radio broadcaster. Initially operating under the on-air name of Dave Mickie, with much fast-talking patter, he was a notable Toronto DJ of the 1960s who attracted critical attention from Marshall McLuhan.  Reinventing himself, and using his real name of David Marsden, he became a much more laid-back free-form DJ, notably at CHOM in Montreal and CHUM-FM in Toronto in the 1970s.  He then became the driving force behind Brampton, Ontario radio station CFNY in the 1980s, becoming an influential figure in the Canadian music industry by giving many Canadian and international alternative rock artists major Canadian radio exposure. During his stint at CFNY, his nickname (often referred to on-air) was "The Mars Bar".

Marsden currently runs the on-air streaming service nythespirit.com.

Early career

Under the name Dave Mickie, he was the original manager of The Revols, a Stratford, Ontario rock band in the late 1950s whose famous members included, Richard Manuel, who would later become part of The Band; Ken Kalmusky, who played with Ian and Sylvia and Great Speckled Bird; and, John Till who formed, and played guitar in, Janis Joplin's Full Tilt Boogie Band. He later became one of Canada's pioneering rock DJs on radio, joining Chatham's CFCO in 1963. Bored with the station's commercial easy listening music, he reportedly brought in some of his own records one night, breaking format and hosting in an uncharacteristically dynamic style. He was fired the next morning, but was quickly rehired after the station learned that his experiment had increased the station's ratings.

He was later hired at CKEY in Toronto where he was called "the most controversial thing on Toronto radio." He parted ways with CKEY after just five months. He became host of Music Hop on CBC Television in 1965, succeeding Alex Trebek. He also started writing a column for the Toronto Star in the same year. He was the subject of a chapter in Marshall McLuhan's book Understanding Media, which lauded his unique hosting style:

That's Patty Baby and that's the girl with the dancing feet and that's Freddy Cannon there on the David Mickie Show in the night time ooohbah scuba-doo how are you booboo. Next we'll be Swinging on a Star and sssshhhwwoooo and sliding on a moonbeam. Waaaaa how about that . . . one of the goodest guys with you . . . this is lovable kissable D.M. in the p.m. at 22 minutes past nine o'clock there, aahhrightie, we're gonna have a Hitline, all you have to do is call WAlnut 5-1151, WAlnut 5-1151, tell them what number it is on the Hitline.

The Dave Mickie name and persona were phased out in the mid-to-late 1960s, and as David Marsden, he joined Montreal's CKGM in 1967.  Under his own name, his hosting style was much less manic and more relaxed, although still informal and unpredictable.

In 1969, he moved to CKGM's sister station, CKGM-FM. Marsden was instrumental in switching the station's format from beautiful music to free form progressive rock. In 1973, Marsden returned to Toronto with his new, completely different on-air persona at CHUM-FM. He left the station in February 1975 to devote more time to his radio commercial production company, but mainly because of the tight playlist CHUM-FM was making their DJs follow. Marsden refused to follow a playlist and left shortly after it was instituted. He eventually returned as an on-air personality at CHIC-FM shortly before it was transformed into CFNY.

Pink Floyd/Dark Side of the Moon
In 1973 Marsden played a major role in introducing the (at that time) largely unknown Pink Floyd to Toronto.  He started a petition to persuade Toronto’s Concert Productions International and promoter Michael Cohl to bring the band, who were touring to promote the as yet unreleased Dark Side of the Moon, to Maple Leaf Gardens for the first time. The resulting show sold out in 45 minutes.  He also played an advance copy of Dark Side of the Moon twice, from start to finish, on his show.  He found out later that Capitol Records had other plans for the album's premiere.  “We preceded the world premiere by four days and, of course, CHUM-FM was only available in the Toronto area,” Marsden said. “But it was a world premiere as far as I was concerned.”

Creates The Spirit of Radio
After CFNY program director Dave Pritchard left the station in 1978 due to conflicts with the station management, Marsden was promoted to program director. The station's mandate had been to present significantly different programming than other radio stations in the Greater Toronto Area. Before Marsden's arrival the station's format had been highly eclectic. Marsden saw the commercial potential of punk and new wave, and widened CFNY's focus even further, creating Canada's first alternative music station. Throughout the 1980s, under the slogan the spirit of radio, CFNY was one of the most influential promoters of new international and Canadian artists most radio stations ignored.

In 1985, Marsden also judged some episodes of CBC Television's battle of the bands competition series Rock Wars.

In July 1987, Marsden and CFNY general manager Bill Hutton hired Don Berns as the new program director. Initially, Marsden continued as director of operations, and as executive producer of the CASBY Awards, but left CFNY a year later. He joined the CBC and moved to Vancouver to produce the TV show Pilot One. That show won several awards, including a silver medal at the Chicago Film and Video Festival. Following that, Marsden launched another freeform modern rock station, Coast 800, later Coast 1040, in Vancouver.

He was later involved in the creation of Iceberg Radio, the first major Canadian Internet radio project, and returned to the terrestrial radio airwaves as host of a freeform rock show on Oshawa, Ontario's The Rock 94.9 in the early 2000s.

The Marsden Theatre
The David Marsden Radio Program, also known as The Marsden Theatre, aired twice a week on Oshawa, Ontario radio station CKGE-FM (a.k.a. The Rock) from June 2003 to December 2014.   Originally, Marsden's show was on Thursday and Friday nights, but it was moved to Saturday and Sunday nights in March 2010. During his time on CKGE, Marsden was the only free form DJ on a commercial radio station in North America.

Though it was announced the show would end on December 14, 2014, Marsden's final broadcast aired on December 7.  There was on-air promotion of a final set of shows the following week (December 13–14), but this never transpired, as Marsden announced on his Facebook page, "I believed it to be best under the circumstances as they played out during the week that I withdraw and disappear quietly from The Rock."

NYTheSpirit.com
Most recently, Marsden and his business partner Igor Loukine created the subscription based radio channel NYTheSpirit.com, which launched in September, 2014.  The station plays a mixture of music, concentrating heavily on the 1980s alternative scene, but with a freeform mentality that mimics Marsden's 1980s heyday at CFNY.

After leaving The Rock, Marsden began doing occasional live hosting gigs on NYTheSpirit; the first one aired on Christmas Eve 2014. Beginning in February 2015, The Marsden Theatre became a regular feature on NYTheSpirit; the live show is currently broadcast Friday and Saturday nights (8PM to midnight, EST).  As well, there is an annual 4-hour Christmas Eve special.

Legacy
Marsden has been profiled in exhibits at the Rock and Roll Hall of Fame, both for his on-air Dave Mickie persona and for his role as program director of CFNY. He is openly gay, and has also worked as a club DJ at gay club nights dubbed "The Mars Bar". He was featured in a 2015 documentary about radio DJs called I Am What I Play, directed by Roger King. An animated likeness of him at the control board on CFNY appears in a video of The Spirit of Radio by the band, RUSH.

References

External links
 David Marsden at SpiritOfRadio
 David Marsden's Official Site

Canadian radio hosts
Canadian radio executives
Gay entertainers
Living people
1940 births
Canadian LGBT broadcasters
21st-century Canadian LGBT people
Canadian gay men